The Fidelity Chessmaster 2100 is a 1988 video game published by The Software Toolworks.

Gameplay
The Fidelity Chessmaster 2100 is a game in which 110 classic chess games from 1834 to 1988 are included.

Reception
Roy Wagner reviewed the game for Computer Gaming World, and stated that "The beginning chess player will find that Chessmaster 2100 is easier to beat with  "Newcomer" and "Coffeehouse" option and this is something every beginner's ego needs."

Reviews
Top Secret - Nov, 1992

References

External links
Review in Info

1988 video games
Amiga games
Apple IIGS games
Atari ST games
Chess software
Commodore 64 games
DOS games
The Software Toolworks games
Video board games
Video game sequels
Video games developed in the United States